The Diedrichshagener Berg, at 129.8 metres, is the highest point on the forested ridge of Kühlung in the northeast German state of Mecklenburg-Vorpommern.

It is located in the district of Rostock only roughly southeast of the Bay of Mecklenburg, south of the Baltic Sea coast, and immediately south of Kühlungsborn and roughly west of Bad Doberan.

Hills of Mecklenburg-Western Pomerania
Rostock (district)